Vaughan Mills is a regional outlet mall located at the southeast quadrant of the Highway 400 and Rutherford Road interchange in Vaughan, Ontario, just south of Canada's Wonderland. It is one of the largest enclosed shopping centres in Canada, and the largest shopping mall in York Region with almost  of retail space. The complex has over 200 retail stores, restaurants, and entertainment outlets.

The mall is served by York Region Transit bus routes at the Vaughan Mills Terminal, with frequent service to Vaughan Metropolitan Centre subway station, the northern terminus of Line 1 Yonge-University of the Toronto subway,  to the south along Jane Street.

History

The shopping centre was designed and built by Ivanhoé Cambridge and Mills Corporation, the latter of which owned a portfolio of malls across the United States. JPRA served as the design architect for the centre, with Bregman + Hamann Architects as the project architect. Like its American counterparts, Vaughan Mills incorporates a "race track" layout to maximize the exposure of the mall tenants. When Vaughan Mills was conceived in 1999, it was meant to be a slightly larger complex at 1.4 million square feet (130,000 m²), with up to 18 anchor retailers and a combined 245 stores and services.

The shopping centre was intended to be a stepping stone for American retailers who wanted to enter the Canadian market, however Bass Pro Shops Outdoor World was the only U.S. retailer to make its exclusive launch there, while other anticipated retailers such as Bed, Bath and Beyond and Burlington Coat Factory never opened at Vaughan Mills. In September 1999, Bed Bath & Beyond and Sun & Ski Sports were among the six American retailers that were announced as Vaughan Mills' first anchor tenants. An ESPN X Games Skatepark was also planned as the main entertainment venue site.

Construction of the mall began in June 2003   and opened on November 4, 2004, and was the first regional enclosed shopping complex to be opened in the Greater Toronto Area (GTA) since the Erin Mills Town Centre in 1990 as well as the first in the GTA built in the 21st century. The mall had its two-millionth visitor less than two months after its opening. Vaughan Mills receives over 13.5 million patrons per year. In August 2006, the Mills Corporation sold its stake in Vaughan Mills to partner Ivanhoé Cambridge.

In January 2013, plans were announced for an expansion of 150,000 square feet and 50 new stores to the mall, which opened in late 2014.  On March 17, 2016, Saks Off 5th opened a  store in the mall.

StyleSense and NASCAR Speedpark were closed in early 2012. They have been replaced by Calvin Klein and Legoland Discovery Centre.

In 2018, Japanese retailer Uniqlo announced an expansion to open four new locations in malls, including Vaughan Mills, which opened on September 28, 2018, in the former HR2 location.

Public transport

The Vaughan Mills Terminal is a York Region Transit (YRT) transit terminal located at 1 Bass Pro Mills Drive, near the northeast corridor of Vaughan Mills near the intersection of Rutherford Road and Jane Street. As of 2017,  ticket machines are installed at this terminal. Only YRT routes connect to this terminal.

Sister malls in Canada

Ivanhoé Cambridge stated in 2011 that their strategic plan was to have four sister malls in Canada, with Vaughan Mills as the first, and additional locations to be located near Calgary, Vancouver and Montreal.

CrossIron Mills, located outside of Calgary, Alberta, opened on August 19, 2009. It has a number of the same retailers as the Vaughan Mills Mall, including Bass Pro Shops. The CrossIron Mills location opened in the spring of 2009, several months ahead of the main mall. The construction, leasing, and opening of the mall has paralleled Vaughan Mills to a degree, as it, too, has occurred during an economic recession.

Tsawwassen Mills, located in Delta, British Columbia, at Highway 17 and 52nd Street on Tsawwassen First Nation Lands south of Vancouver. Construction began in January 2014 and the mall opened on October 5, 2016. Plans call for 16 anchor retailers, including the first Bass Pro Shops Outdoor World location in British Columbia announced as the first anchor tenant.

Ivanhoé Cambridge had originally planned to build what would have been called Laval Mills in Laval, Quebec near Montreal, at the intersection of Quebec Autoroute 440 and Quebec Autoroute 25. However, after three years of planning and analysis, these plans were abandoned in May 2011 citing that their criteria of feasibility and profitability were not met, partly because environmental issues as construction would have disrupted a number of wetlands on or directly connection to the project. At the time the project was cancelled Ivanhoé Cambridge stated they would continue plans for a Mills mall to be built in the Montreal region.

Stores at Vaughan Mills

See also
Other outlet malls in the Greater Toronto Area:

 Toronto Premium Outlets
 Dixie Outlet Mall

Outlet malls in the Greater Golden Horseshoe:

 Outlet Collection at Niagara - St. Catherines, Ontario (Located at the west base of the Garden City Skyway)
 Tanger Outlets Cookstown - Cookstown, Ontario (Located along Highway 400 at Simcoe 89, approximately 30 minutes north of Vaughan Mills)

References

Power centres (retail) in Canada
Shopping malls in the Regional Municipality of York
Shopping malls established in 2004
Buildings and structures in Vaughan
2004 establishments in Ontario
Outlet malls in Canada
Ivanhoé Cambridge